Ni Dahong (born 1960) is a Chinese actor best known for his roles as Sima Yi in the historical television series Three Kingdoms, based on the classical novel Romance of the Three Kingdoms by Luo Guanzhong; and Su Daqiang in family drama All Is Well.

Early life and education
Ni was born in Harbin, Heilongjiang in 1960. Ni became a sent-down youth in Daqing after Mao Zedong launched the Down to the Countryside Movement. In 1980, he was accepted to Jixi Drama Troupe as a student. In 1986 he graduated from Central Academy of Drama and was assigned to National Experimental Theatre (now National Theatre Company of China).

Acting career
In 1984, Ni made his film debut in Xie Jin's Wreaths at the Foot of the Mountain.

In 1991, Ni was cast in I'm A Countryman, making his television debut.

In 1993, he got a small role in Chen Peisi's comedy film Filial Son And Filial Piety.

In 1994, he co-starred with Song Dandan in the family comedy I Love My Family. That same year, he appeared as Long Er in Zhang Yimou's To Live, an epic film adaptation based on the novel of the same name by Yu Hua.

In 2006, he was cast as imperial physician Jiang in Curse of the Golden Flower, an epic drama film written and directed by Zhang Yimou.

Ni had a minor role as Sun Maocai in Qiao Family Courtyard (2007), which earned him a Best Supporting Actor Award at the 3rd TV Shows and Awards.

In 2009, Ni had a supporting role in Zhang Yimou's A Simple Noodle Story. The same year, he featured in The Message, adapted from Mai Jia's novel of the same title. The espionage thriller was directed by Chen Kuo-fu and Gao Qunshu.

Ni co-starred with in the 2010 crime film Wind Blast, directed by Gao Qunshu. That same year, he starred as Sima Yi in the historical television series Three Kingdoms, based on Luo Guanzhong's classical novel Romance of the Three Kingdoms. He received positive reviews for the role. 
He played the lead role of Judge Tian in Judge, for which he received Best Actor Award nominations at the 47th Golden Horse Awards and Asian Film Critics Association Awards.

In 2012, he starred in a crime thriller film Lethal Hostage.

In 2014, Ni had key supporting role as Wei Zhongxian in The White Haired Witch of Lunar Kingdom, a wuxia-fantasy 3D film loosely adapted from Liang Yusheng's novel Baifa Monü Zhuan.

In 2015, he co-starred with Wu Jing and Yu Nan in a war action film Wolf Warriors.

In 2016, Ni played the lead role as Yan Song in the historical television series Counter-Japanese Hero Qi Jiguang.

In 2019, Ni gained recognition for his role as Su Daqiang in the hit family drama All Is Well.

Personal life
Ni married Ni Wei, who is Ni Ping's sister.

Filmography

Film

Television series

Variety show

Awards

References

External links
 
 
 Ni Dahong Chinesemov

1960 births
Male actors from Harbin
Living people
Central Academy of Drama alumni
Chinese male film actors
Chinese male television actors
20th-century Chinese male actors
21st-century Chinese male actors